Koreh Muchi (also Romanized as Koreh Mūchī; also known as Koremochī) is a village in Sigar Rural District, in the Central District of Lamerd County, Fars Province, Iran. At the 2006 census, its population was 754, in 162 families.

Notes 

Populated places in Lamerd County